Ananyevka is a rural locality (a selo) and the administrative center of Ananyevsky Selsoviet, Kulundinsky District, Altai Krai, Russia. The population was 633 as of 2013. There are 6 streets.

Geography 
Ananyevka is located on the Kulundinskaya plain, 56 km east of Kulunda (the district's administrative centre) by road. Yekaterinovka is the nearest rural locality.

References 

Rural localities in Kulundinsky District